Kenneth Harris may refer to:
 
Kenneth F. Harris II, Mechanical Engineer, NASA
Kenneth Harris (journalist) (1919–2005), British journalist
Kenneth D Harris, neuroscientist at University College London
Kenneth R. Harris (1935–2009), mayor of Charlotte, North Carolina
Kenneth Harris, former guitarist for Panic! at the Disco

See also 
 Ken Harris (disambiguation)